Monday Night Brewing is a craft brewery founded in 2006 by Jonathan Baker, Jeff Heck, and Joel Iverson in Atlanta, Georgia.

History

In 2006, founders Jonathan Baker, Jeff Heck, and Joel Iverson met in a Bible study group through Atlanta Westside Presbyterian Church. They began hanging out and brewing beer in Heck's garage on Monday nights, and started putting together a business plan to open their own brewery. In 2011, they launched Eye Patch Ale and Drafty Kilt Scotch Ale, which were brewed under contract by Thomas Creek Brewery in South Carolina. In 2012, they acquired a 20,000-square-foot building at 670 Trabert Ave. NW, Atlanta, next to the Atlanta Hemphill Water Treatment Plant, and installed a 30-barrel brewhouse. In January 2013, Peter Kiley (Brewmaster), joined the team and they brewed their first batch of beer at the new location, and opened to the public for tastings and tours.

The brewery's classic necktie theme and official motto "Weekends Are Overrated" derived from the founders' white collar background: "We started as white collar guys, and when we'd come home on a Monday, we'd loosen our ties and brew beer," said Baker, who has the title, Marketing Guy and Master of Mind Control. 

Monday Night's Bourbon Barrel Drafty Kilt won a gold medal at the 2014 Great American Beer Festival.  Han Brolo Pale Ale won first place in a blind taste test sponsored by Paste Magazine in April 2018, beating out over 150 other entries.

Peter Kiley is the Brewmaster for Monday Night Brewing.  Rachel Kiley is the chief operations officer and Clint Wood is the Vice President of Sales

Locations  
Monday Night Brewing has 3 locations 2 in Atlanta and one in Birmingham, AL.  The original brewery location on 670 Trabert Ave NW, Atlanta, GA 30318 and a new barrel-aging and souring facility in Atlanta's West End at 933 Lee St SW, Atlanta, GA 30310.  Both locations offer Taprooms for on premise tastings.  The Birmingham, AL location is a brewpub offering Tappa style Mexican food along with Hop Hut IPAs, Gargage Series Beers and is located at 14 12th St S BIRMINGHAM, AL 35233.

Beers
Year Round

Lundi IPA, ABV: 7.2%, IBU: 55 
Dr. Robot Blackberry Lemon Sour, ABV: 5.0% 
Han Brolo Pale Ale,  ABV: 4.7%,  IBU: 25 
Slap Fight IPA,  ABV: 5.8%, IBU: 58 
Drafty Kilt Scotch Ale, ABV: 7.2%, IBU: 26 
Blind Pirate Blood Orange IPA, ABV: 7.4%, IBU: 55 
Lay Low IPA, ABV: 3.2%, IBU: 30 

Seasonal

 Rucksack Hefeweizen, ABV: 4.9%
 I'm On A Boat Golden Ale, ABV: 4.8%, IBU: 20
 Whirling Dervish Coffee Stout, ABV: 4.9%
 Dust Bunny American IPA, ABV: 6.8%, IBU: 60
 Cinnamon Cocoa Drafty Kilt, ABV: 7.2%, IBU: 26
 Nitro Drafty Kilt, ABV: 7.2%, IBU: 26

Black Tie Series

Garage Series

See also
 Barrel-aged beer

References

External links
 http://mondaynightbrewing.com/ Monday Night Brewing Website

Beer brewing companies based in Georgia (U.S. state)
Manufacturing companies based in Atlanta
Food and drink companies based in Atlanta
Food and drink companies established in 2006
American companies established in 2006